The German Evangelical Church of Christ Complex (Christ Evangelical Church; United Church of Christ Complex) is a historic church complex at 1236 E. Breckinridge Street in Louisville, Kentucky.  It was built during the years 1902 to 1929 and was added to the National Register of Historic Places in 1987.

The complex was deemed significant "in the area of ethnic and social history between the years 1902 and 1929. The German population was an important element to the settlement of Louisville. It was during this period the strength and influence of the German community was weakening due to national and international conflicts. The church, which is an excellent local example of Romanesque Revival style architecture, the rectory and the gymnasium addition, served as neighborhood symbols offering religious and social activities for its congregants to embrace."

References

German-American culture in Louisville, Kentucky
United Church of Christ churches in Kentucky
Churches on the National Register of Historic Places in Kentucky
Churches in Louisville, Kentucky
National Register of Historic Places in Louisville, Kentucky
1902 establishments in Kentucky
Romanesque Revival architecture in Kentucky
Churches completed in 1902